Publius Rutilius Lupus was a consul of the Roman Republic in 90 BC.

The Social Wars broke out the year before his consulship. His colleague, Lucius Julius Caesar, was sent out to face the Samnites, while Lupus was to fight the Marsi. He chose Gaius Marius (who was a relative of his) as his senior legate. Marius advised him to train his inexperienced troops more before meeting the enemy in battle, but Rutilius ignored this advice. Rutilius advanced and divided his troops between himself and Marius in order to build two bridges to cross the river Tolenus. The Marsic commander, Titus Vettius Scato, was encamped on the other side. He placed a thin screen of troops near the bridge of Marius and with his main body he lay in wait near Lupus's bridge. The following morning, Lupus fell into the trap and lost most of his army, some 8,000 men; he himself received a fatal wound to the head. Marius noticed bodies floating down the river and so crossed and captured the poorly defended enemy camp. The battle was fought on the feast of Matralia: 11 June 90 BC.

References

Sources 
Appian, Civil Wars, 43.
Livy, Epitomes, 73.

2nd-century BC births
Year of birth uncertain
90 BC deaths
1st-century BC Roman consuls
Ancient Roman generals
Roman consuls who died in office
Roman generals killed in action
Lupus, Publius